MV Glomar Vantage is a survey vessel owned and operated by GloMar based in Den Helder, Holland to provide a range of offshore survey capabilities. Until 2015, she was known as Fugro Commander and was owned by Fugro NV and operated by their offshore subsidiary, Fugro Alluvial.

References

Survey ships
1982 ships